Bardstown is a home rule-class city in Nelson County, Kentucky, United States. The population was 13,567 in the 2020 census. It is the county seat of Nelson County.

Bardstown is named for the pioneering Bard brothers. David Bard obtained a  land grant in 1785 in what was then Jefferson County, Virginia. William Bard surveyed and platted the town. It was originally chartered as Baird's Town in 1788, and has been known as Beardstown, and Beards Town. The production of bourbon whiskey is a major industry.

History
First settled by European Americans in 1780, Bardstown is the second oldest city in Kentucky. Named county seat of the newly created Nelson County, Virginia (now Kentucky) in 1784, the town was formally established in 1788. It was incorporated by the state assembly in 1838.

Reflecting the westward migration of Americans over the Blue Ridge Mountains after the Revolutionary War, Bardstown was also the first center of Catholicism west of the Appalachian Mountains in the original western frontier territories of the United States. The Diocese of Bardstown was established on February 8, 1808, to serve all Catholics between the Appalachians and the Mississippi River. This divided the previous all-encompassing Diocese of Baltimore, established in 1789.  In 1841, the seat of the diocese was transferred to nearby Louisville, Kentucky.  The Bardstown cathedral is the Basilica of Saint Joseph Proto-Cathedral, and the city has a Roman Catholic parochial high school, Bethlehem High School.

In 2008, videos showing sewage and storm water spewing from the sewer systems in multiple locations around the city lead to the state of Kentucky to order the city fix the problem. The sewer system was fixed in 2016.

Geography
Bardstown is located in north central Nelson County. It is at the intersection of US routes 31E, 62 and 150. The Bluegrass Parkway passes to the southeast.

Climate
The climate in this area is characterized by hot, humid summers and generally mild to cool winters.  According to the Köppen Climate Classification system, Bardstown has a humid subtropical climate, abbreviated "Cfa" on climate maps.

Demographics

2010
As of the census of 2010, there were 11,700 people, 4,712 households, and 2,949 families living in the city. The racial makeup of the city was 82.31% White (80.79% non-Hispanic), 12.39% African American, 0.21% Native American, 0.75% Asian, 0.01% Pacific Islander, 1.56% from other races, and 2.78% from two or more races. Hispanics or Latinos of any race were 3.71% of the population.

There were 4,712 households, out of which 32.9% had children under the age of 18 living with them, 37.3% were married couples living together, 19.5% had a female householder with no husband present, 5.9% had a male householder with no wife present, and 37.4% were non-families. 31.5% of all households were made up of individuals, and 9.7% had someone living alone who was 65 years of age or older. The average household size was 2.42 and the average family size was 3.01.

The age distribution was 27.7% under 18, 8.8% from 18 to 24, 27.1% from 25 to 44, 24.2% from 45 to 64, and 12.2% who were 65 or older. The median age was 34.0 years. For every 100 females, there were 88.3 males. For every 100 females age 18 and over, there were 83.3 males.

As of the 2010 Census, the median income for a household in the city was $50,046, and the median income for a family was $60,609. Full-time male workers had a median income of $46,500 versus $36,551 for females. The per capita income for the city was $26,059. About 11.3% of families and 15.3% of the population were below the poverty line, including 21.6% of those under age 18 and 9.0% of those age 65 or over.

2000
As of the census of 2000, there were 10,374 people, 4,195 households, and 2,701 families living in the city. The racial makeup of the city was 82.11% White, 15.07% African American, 0.13% Native American, 0.94% Asian, 0.01% Pacific Islander, 0.67% from other races, and 1.07% from two or more races. Hispanic and Latino of any race were 1.38% of the population.

There were 4,195 households, out of which 34.6% had children under the age of 18 living with them, 42.7% were married couples living together, 17.6% had a female householder with no husband present, and 35.6% were non-families. 31.2% of all households were made up of individuals, and 10.9% had someone living alone who was 65 years of age or older. The average household size was 2.40 and the average family size was 3.00.

In the city, the population was spread out, with 27.7% under 18, 9.8% from 18 to 24, 29.8% from 25 to 44, 19.7% from 45 to 64, and 12.9% who were 65 or older. The median age was 33 years. For every 100 females, there were 87.8 males. For every 100 females age 18 and over, there were 83.6 males.

The median income for a household in the city was $31,497, and the median income for a family was $41,065. Males had a median income of $31,850 versus $20,537 for females. The per capita income for the city was $17,681. About 14.6% of families and 17.7% of the population were below the poverty line, including 25.6% of those under age 18 and 15.8% of those age 65 or over.

Arts and culture

The Old Talbott Tavern, built in 1779, has been patronized by frontiersman Daniel Boone, and future 16th President Abraham Lincoln. Bullet holes in an upstairs wall are reputed to have been shot by Jesse James. It had been rumored that the Tavern is haunted.

Distilleries operating in Bardstown include Heaven Hill, Barton 1792, and Lux Row Distillers. The regional production of bourbon is celebrated at the annual Kentucky Bourbon Festival, whose promoters have trademarked the phrase "Bourbon Capital of the World" to apply exclusively to Bardstown. The festival was designated Kentucky's official bourbon festival by the Kentucky General Assembly in 2000.

The Civil War Museum in Bardstown is the fourth-largest Civil War museum in the United States.

Other notable sites include:
 Bardstown Historic District, listed on the National Register of Historic Places. 
 Bardstown Historical Museum.
 Oscar Getz Museum of Whiskey, which celebrates Bardstown's history in the production of whiskey.
 Wickland, a private residence that has been the home of three governors of Kentucky and is open to the public for tours.
 A memorial to steamboat inventor John Fitch in Courthouse Square, including a replica of his first steamboat.
 Anatok, a now-demolished slave plantation built by Charles Haydon; also the birthplace of Daniel Rudd.

Bardstown has a lending library, a branch of the Nelson County Public Library.

Parks and recreation
My Old Kentucky Home State Park is located in Bardstown. Judge John Rowan and his wife Ann Lytle Rowan commissioned the construction of a large mansion there named Federal Hill.  The Stephen Foster Story is an outdoor musical at the park about Stephen Foster, composer of "My Old Kentucky Home." It was designated Kentucky's official outdoor musical by the Kentucky General Assembly in 2002.

Education
Almost all of the city is served by the Bardstown City Schools; the district also includes significant portions of the built-up area outside the city limits. Ryan Clark is the Superintendent of Schools.

The school district includes an Early Childhood Education Center, Primary School, Elementary School, Middle School and High School.

Some of the city is instead served by the surrounding Nelson County School District. By contrast, one of the county district's two high schools, Nelson County High, physically lies within the Bardstown school district.

Bardstown is also home to St. Joseph School and Bethlehem High School, both of which have been operational since 1819. Both schools are under the jurisdiction of the Roman Catholic Archdiocese of Louisville.

Media
The Kentucky Standard is a newspaper in Bardstown.

In early 2023, Bardstown was ranked as number 8 of Travel and Leisure 20 Most Beautiful Small Towns in America. Mentioned were the Federal and Georgian achitiecture, cobblestone paths, and gateway to Kentucky Bourbon Trail.

Infrastructure

Transportation
The Bluegrass Parkway is a limited-access highway that passes just south of Bardstown. A part of the Kentucky parkway system, the highway was formerly a toll road. Tolls were removed in 1991 after its construction bonds had been paid off.

Railroad freight service is provided by the R.J. Corman Railroad Central Kentucky Lines, over the former Bardstown Branch of the Louisville and Nashville Railroad.

Notable people
 J. C. W. Beckham, grandson of Charles A. Wickliffe, U.S. Senator from Kentucky, 35th Governor of Kentucky, born in Wickland
 William Pope Duval, first civilian governor of the Florida Territory
 Ephraim H. Foster, U.S. Senator from Tennessee
 Lucy Ann Kidd-Key, president of North Texas Female College (later Kidd-Key College)
 Marie Mattingly Meloney, journalist
 Hal Moore, retired U.S. Army lieutenant general. Co-author of We Were Soldiers Once… And Young
 Leroy Augustus Stafford, Confederate brigadier general was educated in Bardstown.
 Charles A. Wickliffe, 14th Governor of Kentucky, appointed Postmaster General built and resided in Wickland.
 Robert C. Wickliffe, son of Charles A. Wickliffe, Lieutenant Governor and 15th Governor of Louisiana was born in Wickland.

See also

 Disappearance of Crystal Rogers

References

External links

 City of Bardstown
 Official tourism site

 
County seats in Kentucky
Cities in Nelson County, Kentucky
Populated places established in 1780
1780 establishments in Virginia
Cities in Kentucky